Harry Mwanga Nkumbula International Airport , formerly Livingstone Airport (ICAO: FLLI), is an international airport on the northern edge of Livingstone, Zambia. The airport is named after Harry Mwanga Nkumbula, who was a leader of the Zambian African National Congress.

Location

Overview
Constructed in 1950, as a domestic airport, it became an international destination due to its proximity to the Victoria Falls, only  to the south, by road. Between 2011 and 2017, the government-owned Zambia Airports Corporation Limited (ZACL), which operates the airport, renovated and improved the airport infrastructure and facilities. 

The renovations included (a) a new terminal building (b) a new main runway (c) a new apron and (d) new apron lights. The previous airport had capacity to handle a maximum of 250,000 passengers a year. The new airport can handle anywhere from 700,000 to one million passengers a year. In 2019, 175,000 passengers passed through the airport.

Facilities
The airport has two runways. The main runway 10/28 is the longer one. It is paved and has runway lights. The shorter runway is 15/33. It has a paved surface, but it has no runway lights.

Airlines and destinations

See also           
Transport in Zambia
List of airports in Zambia

References

External links

Livingstone, Zambia
Airports in Zambia
Buildings and structures in Southern Province, Zambia
Buildings and structures completed in 1950
1950 establishments in Northern Rhodesia